European route E 93 is an obsolete route of the United Nations international E-road network. It was reclassified as the route E95.

External links 
 UN Economic Commission for Europe: Overall Map of E-road Network (2007)
 List of E-routes

93